is one of 24 wards of Osaka city, Japan. It stands at the mouth of the Yodo River. It is home to the popular western-style theme park of Universal Studios Japan. It will be the site of Expo 2025, a World's Fair to be held in 2025.

Notable people from Konohana-ku, Osaka
 Miyavi, Japanese/Zainichi Korean guitarist, singer-songwriter, record producer and actor (Real Name: Takamasa Ishihara, Nihongo: 石原 崇雅, Ishihara Takamasa)
 Masaru Hamaguchi (Nihongo: 濱口 優), Japanese comedian and member of Japanese comic duo Yoiko
 Ryohei Odai (Nihongo: 小田井 涼平), Japanese actor and voice actor (Gundam Seed and Kamen Rider Ryuki)
 You Yokoyama (Nihongo: 横山 裕), Japanese idol, singer, actor, scriptwriter, radio host, lyricist and member of Kanjani Eight
 Yuko Nasaka (Nihongo: 名坂有子), Japanese avant-garde artist
 Kasumi Saeki (Nihongo: 佐伯 霞), Japanese professional boxer and former WBO mini flyweight world champion

Transportation

Trains
West Japan Railway Company (JR West)
 Osaka Loop Line: Nishikujō Station
 Sakurajima Line: Nishikujō Station - Ajikawaguchi Station - Universal City Station - Sakurajima Station
Hanshin Electric Railway
 Hanshin Namba Line: Nishikujō Station - Chidoribashi Station - Dempō Station

References

External links

Official website of Konohana 

 
Wards of Osaka